Fidanza is a surname. Notable people with the surname include:

Giovanni Fidanza (born 1965), Italian cyclist
Dominique Fidanza (born 1979), Belgian-Italian singer

External links
The European Fidanza site, which refers to the family surname's genealogical tree.